Andrew Nels Nelson (born July 27, 1993) is a male Canadian volleyball athlete. He was a member of the Canada men's junior national team at the 2012 Men's Junior NORCECA Volleyball Championship.

Sporting Achievements

Individual Awards

 2011/2012 Canada West Men's Volleyball - Rookie of the Year
 2011/2012 CIS Men's Volleyball - Rookie of the Year
 2011/2012 CIS Men's Volleyball - All-Rookie Team
 2011/2012 University of Regina - Male Rookie of the Year

References

1993 births
Living people
Canadian men's volleyball players
Sportspeople from Regina, Saskatchewan